This list of mountains and hills of Saxony shows a selection of high and well-known mountains and hills in the German state of Saxony (in order of elevation):

See also 
 List of mountain and hill ranges in Germany
 List of the highest mountains in Germany
 List of the highest mountains in the German states
 List of mountains in the Ore Mountains

Saxony
Mount